Valentine Joseph Doube (3 January 1915 – 18 January 1988) was an Australian politician.

Born in Brighton to hat maker Francis William Robert Doube and Honora Fitzgerald, Doube was educated at St James' School in Gardenvale before studying at Melbourne University, receiving a Diploma of Physical Education in 1940. He taught physical education in primary schools from 1933 until 1941, when he enlisted in the Australian Imperial Force. On 17 May 1941 he married Freda May Scott, with whom he had three sons. In 1943 he transferred to the Royal Australian Air Force, where he remained until the end of the war.

In 1945, the year he joined the Labor Party, Doube began work at the Department of Immigration. In 1946, he unsuccessfully contested the federal seat of Henty in a by-election. In 1950 he was elected to the Victorian Legislative Assembly as the member for Oakleigh. He was appointed Minister for Health in March 1955 but lost the position following Labor's crushing defeat at that year's elections.

Doube held his seat until 1961, when he was defeated, but returned to the Assembly in 1970 as the member for Albert Park. He retired from politics in 1979, becoming an executive member of Amnesty International and a member of the Victorian State Relief Committee.

References

1915 births
1988 deaths
Australian Labor Party members of the Parliament of Victoria
Members of the Victorian Legislative Assembly
University of Melbourne alumni
Australian Army soldiers
Royal Australian Air Force officers
Royal Australian Air Force personnel of World War II
Australian Army personnel of World War II
Public servants from Melbourne
Australian schoolteachers
20th-century Australian politicians
People from Brighton, Victoria